The Walking Dead is a franchise that includes comic books, a TV series, and a video game series. The characters or their actions may differ from one series to another. This is an index of lists of The Walking Dead characters.

 List of The Walking Dead (comics) characters
 List of The Walking Dead (TV series) characters
 List of The Walking Dead (video game series) characters
 List of Fear the Walking Dead characters